Acid orange 5 is a compound with formula Na(C6H5NHC6H4N=NC6H4SO3). It is an azo dye.
It is also used as a pH indicator; it is red in pH under 1.4, orange-yellow in pH over 3.2.

References

Azo dyes
PH indicators
Benzenesulfonates
Organic sodium salts
Acid dyes